Elachista salinaris is a moth of the family Elachistidae. It is found in the United States, where it has been recorded from Utah and California.

The wingspan is about 11 mm. The ground color of the forewing is white, but black at the extreme costal edge near the base. There is a narrow brownish shade along the costa broadening into a triangular costal patch at two-thirds which is then continued as a brown line across the wing to the termen. The hindwings are dark fuscous. Adults have been recorded on wing in May.

The larvae feed on Scirpus paludosus. They mine the leaves of their host plant. 
The mine has the form of a long, irregular gallery. It is nearly transparent in some places, while it is packed with frass elsewhere.

References

salinaris
Moths described in 1925
Moths of North America